Comparative Education is a quarterly peer-reviewed academic journal dedicated to comparative education. It was established in 1964 by Wilfred Douglas Halls (University of Oxford) and Edmund James King (King's College London). It is published by Taylor & Francis and the editor-in-chief is David Phillips (University of Oxford). According to the Journal Citation Reports, the journal has a 2017 impact factor of 1.579, ranking it 95th out of 238 journals in the category "Education & Educational Research".

References

External links

Publications established in 1964
Quarterly journals
Education journals
Comparative education
English-language journals
Taylor & Francis academic journals